Vyacheslav Zelimkhanovich Bitarov  (born February 21, 1961, village Verhny Sadon, North Ossetian Autonomous Soviet Socialist Republic, USSR) is a Russian politician.

Head of the Republic of North Ossetia-Alania (2016—2021) Chairman of the Government of the Republic of North Ossetia-Alania to 24 September 2015.

He is married and has three children.

References

External links
 Биография
 Статья на OnKavkaz.com

1961 births
Living people
Ossetian people
Heads of North Ossetia–Alania